Events from the year 1853 in Russia

Incumbents
 Monarch – Nicholas I

Events

  Battle of Akhalzic

Births

 Lidija Figner, revolutionary and a prominent member of the Narodniks  (died 1920)

Deaths
 Elena Yezhova

References

1853 in Russia
Years of the 19th century in the Russian Empire